Japalura tricarinata is a species of agamid lizard endemic to Asia.

Common names
Common names for this species include three-keeled mountain lizard, cloud-forest japalure, Sikkimese mountain lizard, and three-keeled forest agama.

Geographic range
J. tricarinata is found in India, Nepal, and Tibet (China).

References

Further reading
Blyth E. 1853. "Notices and Descriptions of various Reptiles, new or little known". Journ. Asiatic Soc. Bengal 22: 639–655. (Calotes tricarinatus, new species, p. 650).
Boulenger GA. 1885. Catalogue of the Lizards in the British Museum (Natural History). Second Edition. Volume I. ... Agamidæ. London: Tustees of the British Museum (Natural History). (Taylor and Francis, printers). xii + 436 pp. + Plates I-XXXII. (Acanthosaura tricarinata, pp. 306–307).
Das I. 2002. A Photographic Guide to Snakes and Other Reptiles of India. Sanibel Island, Florida: Ralph Curtis Books. 144 pp. . (Japalura tricarinata, p. 76).
 Gruber U. 1975. "Agame Japalura tricarinata aus dem zentralen Nepal-Himalaya ". Das Aquarium 77: 502–505. (in German).
 Macey JR et al. 2000. "Evaluating trans-Tethys migration: An example using acrodont lizard phylogenetics". Syst. Biol. 49 (2): 233–256.
Smith MA. 1935. The Fauna of British India, Including Ceylon and Burma. Reptilia and Amphibia. Vol. II.—Sauria. London: Secretary of State for India in Council. (Taylor and Francis, printers). xiii + 440 pp. + Plate I + 2 maps. (Japalura tricarinata, pp. 169–170, Figure 51).

Japalura
Reptiles of China
Reptiles of India
Reptiles of Nepal
Fauna of Tibet
Taxa named by Edward Blyth
Reptiles described in 1853